The following is a list of pipeline accidents in the United States in 1967. It is one of several lists of U.S. pipeline accidents. See also: list of natural gas and oil production accidents in the United States.

Incidents 

This is not a complete list of all pipeline accidents. For natural gas alone, the Pipeline and Hazardous Materials Safety Administration (PHMSA), a United States Department of Transportation agency, has collected data on more than 3,200 accidents deemed serious or significant since 1987.

A "significant incident" results in any of the following consequences:
 Fatality or injury requiring in-patient hospitalization.
 $50,000 or more in total costs, measured in 1984 dollars.
 Liquid releases of five or more barrels (42 US gal/barrel).
 Releases resulting in an unintentional fire or explosion.

PHMSA and the National Transportation Safety Board (NTSB) post-incident data and results of investigations into accidents involving pipelines that carry a variety of products, including natural gas, oil, diesel fuel, gasoline, kerosene, jet fuel, carbon dioxide, and other substances. Occasionally pipelines are re-purposed to carry different products.

The following incidents occurred during 1967:
 1967 A Shell Oil Company 6-inch propane pipeline exploded and burned while it was being worked on, in Meeker, Oklahoma on January 10. Two workers were killed.
 1967 A leaking gas main in the Jamaica section of New York City, New York caught fire on January 13. Two pieces of FDNY equipment responding to the gas leak report were burned, as well as numerous buildings. The fire spread to 13 alarm size, with 63 fire companies being used to control the situation. Seventeen homes were destroyed. The cause of the leak was the failure of a moisture scrubbing "drip pot" on the pipeline.
 1967 Manufacturers Light and Heat Company announced they were asking the Federal Power Commission permission to allow a new pipeline to replace 73.5 miles of older pipeline, which was having 200 to 450 leaks a year in Eastern Pennsylvania.
 1967 On May 16, a pile driver ruptured a propane pipeline in Dearborn, Michigan. The escaping gas caught fire, with two construction workers being killed, and four others seriously burned.
 1967 A leaking pipeline released  of JP-4 grade jet fuel in Wilmington, California on June 30. There was no fire.
 1967 On July 26, a bulldozer hit a gas pipeline, south of Childress, Texas, causing a large gas fire. The bulldozer operator was slightly injured. The fire burned for four days.  
 1967 On August 5, a leaking gas main forced five homes to be evacuated in Queens, New York.
 1967 On August 10, a gas main that had been capped the day before leaked natural gas into a concession stand in Bamberg, South Carolina. An explosion of the gas was likely caused by an electrical spark, but the 6:40 am time likely prevented any injuries.
 1967 A road construction machine ruptured an 18-inch Plantation Pipeline on September 25 in Akron, Alabama, spilling more than 5,000 gallons of gasoline. The gasoline had to be burned off to eliminate it.

References

Lists of pipeline accidents in the United States
pipeline accidents
1967 in the environment
1967 in the United States